Emil Frederick "Dutch" Loeffler, Jr. (June 5, 1895 – March 19, 1948) was an American professional golfer and golf course designer.

Early life
Loeffler was born on June 5, 1895 at Oakmont, Pennsylvania, to Swiss immigrants Emil Loeffler, Sr. and his wife Margaret, both of whom were born in Berne, Switzerland.

Golf career
Loeffler had two top-10 finishes in major championships and had four wins in other tournaments. He had a long career as both course superintendent and head professional at Oakmont Country Club.

Oakmont Country Club
Loeffler started working as a caddy at Oakmont when he was 10. He was promoted to caddiemaster in 1912 and took over as the course's superintendent (greenkeeper) in 1916, a position he retained until 1948. Loeffler assisted in modification of the course, including facilitating addition of many hazards that became a hallmark of Oakmont. After the death of head pro Charley Rowe in 1927, Loeffler assumed that role as well. When he relinquished it in 1947, he was reportedly the highest paid pro in America. His replacement, young Lew Worsham, won the U.S. Open a month after he took charge at Oakmont.

U.S. Open
Loeffler qualified for six U.S. Opens. His best finish was at the 1921 U.S. Open with a 10th place finish.

PGA Championship
In 1921, the PGA Championship invited the top 31 professional finishers at the 1921 U.S. Open, along with the defending champion, to the tournament and as such Loeffler was invited. Loeffler finished in a tie for 17th place with his first round loss in match play to Cyril Walker on the 37th hole. Loeffer's best finish at the PGA Championship was a tie for 5th (quarter-final finish) in 1922.

Golf course design
Loeffler is credited with designing over 20 golf courses, including the former Alcoma Golf Club, which was renamed 3 Lakes Golf Course in Penn Hills, Pennsylvania. In 2018, he was elected to the Western Pennsylvania Golf Hall of Fame.

Military service
Loeffler served in the infantry in World War I where he was wounded. He was a corporal in Company E, 327th Infantry, 82nd Division, serving from September 20, 1917 to May 28, 1919.

Death
Loeffler died on March 19, 1948—at the end of a 65-day stay at Presbyterian Hospital—of respiratory failure due to pneumonia. He was a widower, his wife Hilda having preceded him in death in 1945.

Professional wins (4)
1920 Pennsylvania Open Championship, Western Pennsylvania Open Championship
1922 Pennsylvania Open Championship
1933 Tri-State PGA Championship

Results in major championships

Note: Loeffler played in only the U.S. Open and PGA Championship.
DNP = Did not play
? = unknown
R64, R32, R16, QF, SF = Round in which player lost in PGA Championship match play
"T" indicates a tie for a place
Yellow background for top-10

References

American male golfers
Golf course architects
Golfers from Pennsylvania
United States Army personnel of World War I
People from Oakmont, Pennsylvania
1895 births
1948 deaths